Bedbugs is the second studio album by Canadian rock band Odds, released in 1993.

The album's lead single, "Heterosexual Man", was supported by a video that featured the band appearing in drag with members of The Kids in the Hall. "It Falls Apart" was also a notable single. "Jack Hammer", which was released as the third single from the album, features guest appearances by Robert Quine and Warren Zevon. "Yes (Means It's Hard to Say No)" charted well in many European countries. Three singles from the album reached #1 on RPM's Canadian Content chart.

Track listing
All songs written by Odds.

References

1993 albums
Odds (band) albums
Zoo Entertainment (record label) albums